Tyrell Belford (born 6 May 1994 in Nuneaton), is an English former semi-professional footballer who played as a goalkeeper.

Club career
Belford started his career as a junior with Coventry City before joining Liverpool's youth system in 2009.

Belford signed a two-year contract with Swindon Town on 31 July 2013 after being released from Liverpool and later made his debut for the Wiltshire club when he played the whole 90 minutes of Swindon's 2–1 Football League Trophy victory over Plymouth Argyle. On 28 June 2016, Belford joined National League side Southport on a season-long loan. On the opening day of the 2016–17 campaign, Belford made his Southport debut in a 3–0 away defeat to newly relegated side Dagenham & Redbridge. However, after appearing only nine times by November, due to a change in management, Belford returned to Swindon Town.

On 11 November 2016, Swindon Town announced that Belford would leave the club after a mutual termination within his contract.

After being released from Swindon Town, Belford joined National League South side Oxford City on the same day.

Tyrell joined Nuneaton Town the following year, but was released by mutual consent on 25 September 2017. Following this Belford, had spells at Hinckley AFC and Swindon Supermarine, before announcing he would be taking a break from football. He started the 2018–19 season at Romulus.

In late 2019 he returned to Nuneaton Borough.

He joined Stratford Town in June 2020 before a move to Stafford Rangers in December 2021.

International career
Belford represented England at both Under-16 and Under-17 level.

Personal life
He is the son of the Dale Belford and the brother of Cameron Belford, who also plays as a goalkeeper.

Career statistics

Honours
 2011 FIFA U-17 World Cup: England squad member

References

External links
 
 

1994 births
Living people
English footballers
Association football goalkeepers
Liverpool F.C. players
Swindon Town F.C. players
Southport F.C. players
Oxford City F.C. players
Hinckley A.F.C. players
Swindon Supermarine F.C. players
Coventry City F.C. players
English Football League players
National League (English football) players
England youth international footballers
Romulus F.C. players
Nuneaton Borough F.C. players
Stratford Town F.C. players
Stafford Rangers F.C. players